"Rum and Raybans" is a song by American recording artist Sean Kingston, featuring vocals from British singer Cher Lloyd. Written by Cameron Forbes and produced by "The Elev3n", the song was originally released as the second single from Kingston's third studio album, Back 2 Life but was scrapped due to poor charting and promotion. It was released on November 16, 2012 as a digital download, in both a clean and an explicit version, and then again on July 6, 2018 as an EP including the acapella and instrumental versions of the track.

Music video 
A lyric video was uploaded to YouTube on October 16, 2012. The music video, directed by Hannah Lux Davis, was released November 18, 2012. It shows Kingston partying with other people but Lloyd does not appear in the video. Chris Brown makes a cameo appearance.

Track listing

Charts

Release history

References

2012 songs
2012 singles
Sean Kingston songs
Cher Lloyd songs
Songs written by Sean Kingston
Music videos directed by Hannah Lux Davis
Epic Records singles